Caulophacus elegans is a species of glass sponges belonging to the subfamily Lanuginellinae. The type specimen has been found in Central Kuroshio Current, near Japan.

References 

 Schulze, F.E. 1887a. Report on the Hexactinellida collected by H.M.S. ‘Challenger’ during the years 1873-1876. Report on the Scientific Results of the Voyage of H.M.S. ‘Challenger’, 1873-1876. Zoology 21 (Text): 1-514

External links 

 
 
 

Hexactinellida
Sponges described in 1886
Fauna of Japan